The Death of Noah Glass (2018) is a novel by Australian author Gail Jones.

Plot summary 
The Death of Noah Glass concerns three main characters: the eponymous Noah Glass and his children Evie and Martin. Noah has been found dead face down in the communal swimming pool at his apartment complex. Evie and Martin reconnect as a result, and are caught off guard when local police come with questions about their father's alleged involvement in an international art heist.

Reviews 

 Sydney Review of Books 
 The Saturday Paper

Awards and nominations 

 Shortlisted for 2019 Victorian Premier's Literary Awards
 Shortlisted for the 2019 Miles Franklin Award
Winner of the 2019 Prime Minister's Literary Award - Fiction
Shortlisted for the 2019 ALS Gold Medal
Shortlisted for 2019 Voss Literary Prize
 Winner of the 2020 Adelaide Festival Awards for Literature – Fiction

References

2018 Australian novels
Novels by Gail Jones
Text Publishing books